The 2012 Formula Renault 2.0 Northern European Cup is the seventh Formula Renault 2.0 Northern European Cup season. The season began at Hockenheimring on 21 April and finished on 14 October at Spa, after 20 races at 8 events.

Drivers and teams
After the Formula Renault UK was cancelled for the 2012 season, British team Fortec Motorsports joined the Formula Renault 2.0 NEC with refugee Josh Hill and Intersteps champion Jake Dennis among its drivers, whereas Manor Competition followed with Jordan King.

Race calendar and results
The eight-event provisional calendar for the 2012 season was announced on 22 November 2011. The Spa round was later moved to the end of the season.

Standings

Drivers' Championship
 Championship points were awarded on a 30, 24, 20, 17, 16, 15, 14, 13, 12, 11, 10, 9, 8, 7, 6, 5, 4, 3, 2, 1 to the top 20 classified finishers in each race.

Teams' Championship

References

External links
 Official website of the Formula Renault 2.0 NEC championship

NEC
Formula Renault 2.0 NEC
Formula Renault 2.0 NEC
Renault NEC